The National Cadet Corps Ghana (NCCG) of Ghana is an amalgamation of Army (GA), Navy (GN), Air Force (GHF), Police (GPS) and the Fire (GNFRS) Cadets in Ghana.

It came into establishment in 1954 under the ministry of education, with its current form and organization being establish in 2002, under the Ministry of Youth and Sports.

National Coordinator General 
 Mr. Nicholas Nii Tettey-Amarteifio – National Cadet Coordinator General, Coordinator of the National Cadet Corps, Ghana
 Derek Clottey – Chief Staff Officer,
 Three Sector Co-ordinators
 Sixteen Regional Co-ordinators

History 
The Cadet Corps of Ghana, was first established in 1954 at the Ghana Secondary Technical School (GSTS),  Takoradi in the Western Region (with just a handful of student cadet). Currently the Corps has membership school strength of about 223 and a numerical strength of about 65,380 in all ten regions of Ghana.

Structure 
The National Cadet Corps has the following as its command and administrative structures.
 His Excellency the President – Commandant In Chief of the Cadet Corps
 His Excellency the Vice President – Deputy Commandant In Chief of the Cadet Corps
 Minister of Youth and Sports – over seeing Ministry of the Cadet
 Ghana Education Service
 Ministry Chief Directors
 Cadet Headquarters
 Sectoral Headquarters
 Regional Headquarters
 District Headquarters
 Schools Cadet Corps

Task/Appointment 
The Adult Staff in an institution can be given the following appointments:
 OC [ Officer Commanding ] – Officer Commanding the school
 SUO [ Senior Under officer ] – Second In Command
 JUO [ Junior Under Officer ] – Adjutant

Cadets follow the below ranks:

See also 
 Military of Ghana
 Community Cadet Forces
 Australian Defence Force Cadets
 Bangladesh National Cadet Corps
 Canadian Cadet Organizations
 Combined Cadet Force
 Junior Reserve Officers' Training Corps
 National Cadet Corps (India)
 National Cadet Corps (Singapore)
 National Cadet Corps (Sri Lanka)
 New Zealand Cadet Forces

References

External links 
 The National Cadet Corps, Ghana (NCCG)

Military of Ghana
Youth organizations established in 2002
1954 establishments in Gold Coast (British colony)